In mathematics, specifically set theory and model theory, a stationary set is a set that is not too small in the sense that it intersects all club sets, and is analogous to a set of non-zero measure in measure theory. There are at least three closely related notions of stationary set, depending on whether one is looking at subsets of an ordinal, or subsets of something of given cardinality, or a powerset.

Classical notion
If  is a cardinal of uncountable cofinality,  and  intersects every club set in  then  is called a stationary set.  If a set is not stationary, then it is called a thin set. This notion should not be confused with the notion of a thin set in number theory.

This is because if  is any club set, then  is a club set, thus  is non empty. Therefore,  must be stationary.

See also: Fodor's lemma

The restriction to uncountable cofinality is in order to avoid trivialities: Suppose  has countable cofinality.

Then  can be partitioned into  many disjoint stationary sets. This result is due to Solovay. If  is a successor cardinal, this result is due to Ulam and is easily shown by means of what is called an Ulam matrix.

H. Friedman has shown that for every countable successor ordinal , every stationary subset of  contains a closed subset of order type .

Jech's notion
This notion is due to Thomas Jech.

The appropriate version of Fodor's lemma also holds for this notion.

Generalized notion
There is yet a third notion, model theoretic in nature and sometimes referred to as generalized stationarity. This notion is probably due to Magidor, Foreman and Shelah and has also been used prominently by Woodin.

Now let  be a nonempty set. A set  is club (closed and unbounded) if and only if there is a function  such that .

References 

 Foreman, Matthew (2002) Stationary sets, Chang's Conjecture and partition theory, in Set Theory (The Hajnal Conference) DIMACS Ser. Discrete Math. Theoret. Comp. Sci., 58, Amer. Math. Soc., Providence, RI. pp. 73–94.  File at

External links 
 

Set theory
Ordinal numbers